George Andrew J. MacKay (born 13 March 1992) is a British actor. He began his career as a child actor in Peter Pan (2003). He had starring roles in the British war drama Private Peaceful (2012), the romantic film How I Live Now (2013),  For Those in Peril (2013), for which he won a BAFTA Scotland Award and was nominated for the BAFTA Rising Star Award, and Marrowbone (2017). He garnered recognition for his leading role in 1917 (2019) which received critical acclaim and numerous awards.

Early life and education
MacKay was born in Hammersmith, London to Kim Baker, a British costume designer from London, and Paul MacKay, an Australian working in lighting and stage management. He grew up in Barnes with his younger sister. He is of Irish descent on his mother’s side, his maternal grandmother being from Cork.

MacKay attended The Harrodian School, a private school in London. When he was 17, he unsuccessfully auditioned for entrance to the Royal Academy of Dramatic Art and the London Academy of Music and Dramatic Art.

In early January 2023 Mackay became 1 of almost 100 famous figures in the UK to sign a letter to the National Government in order for them to take "immediate action" against Iran's Executions.

Career

2002–2012: Child acting

In 2002, MacKay was spotted at school by an acting scout who asked him to audition for a role in P. J. Hogan’s 2003 film adaptation of Peter Pan. He attended a workshop and won the role of one of the Lost Boys, Curly, in what was his first professional acting job.

In 2005, at the age of 13, he won the role of Riccio in The Thief Lord, the film adaptation of Cornelia Funke’s best-selling children’s novel. He was also cast in the lead role in Johnny and the Bomb, a BBC three-part television drama adapted from Terry Pratchett’s novel of the same name. MacKay also had some work in television, including roles in Rose and Maloney, Footprints in the Snow and The Brief. In the 2008 film Defiance, MacKay played Aron, the youngest of the four Bielski brothers. In 2009 he portrayed Harry in The Boys Are Back starring Clive Owen. MacKay co-starred in the Marc Evans-directed musical film Hunky Dory opposite Minnie Driver, Aneurin Barnard and Kimberley Nixon, which is set in 1970s Swansea.

2012–present
In 2012, he played the main character, Private Tommo Peaceful, in Private Peaceful, and appeared as a paralyzed soldier in the inspirational film The Best of Men.

In 2013, MacKay portrayed Eddie in How I Live Now opposite Saoirse Ronan and directed by Kevin Macdonald, and starred as Davy in the musical film Sunshine on Leith, featuring songs by The Proclaimers, directed by Dexter Fletcher. In 2014, MacKay played the role of Joe, a 20-year-old struggling to come out in a homophobic Britain in 1984 in the film Pride (based on a true story) also starring Bill Nighy. In 2015, Mackay took the lead role as Richard Miller in Eugene O'Neill’s coming-of-age play, Ah, Wilderness! directed by Natalie Abrahami at Young Vic.

In July 2015, MacKay filled the title role of Lewis Aldridge in the BBC’s two-part television adaptation of Sadie Jones’ debut novel The Outcast. In February 2016, he portrayed the part of Bill Turcotte in the Hulu production of Stephen King’s sci-fi/suspense thriller 11.22.63.

From 29 March to 14 May 2016, MacKay performed the part of Mick in Harold Pinter’s play The Caretaker directed by Matthew Warchus at The Old Vic Theatre in London opposite Timothy Spall and Daniel Mays. In the 2016 film Captain Fantastic, MacKay portrayed Bodevan, eldest son of Ben Cash (Viggo Mortensen).

In 2017, he played Jack, the main character in Marrowbone, a psychological horror film directed and written by Sergio G. Sánchez, and also starring Anya Taylor-Joy, Charlie Heaton and Mia Goth. MacKay portrayed Prince Hamlet in Ophelia, a 2018 film retelling the story of Shakespeare’s play from the perspective of the young female character Ophelia. The film premiered at the 2018 Sundance Film Festival, and included Daisy Ridley, Naomi Watts, Clive Owen, and Tom Felton in the cast.

In the 2018 film Where Hands Touch, MacKay portrayed Lutz, a member of the Hitler Youth in Nazi Germany who falls in love with a biracial girl, portrayed by Amandla Stenberg.

In a 2019 release, MacKay interpreted the role of outlaw Ned Kelly in True History of the Kelly Gang directed by Justin Kurzel. Adapted from the Booker Prize-winning novel of the same name by Peter Carey, the film premiered at the 2019 Toronto International Film Festival. That same year, MacKay played the lead role of Lance corporal William Schofield, a young British World War I soldier in 1917, directed by Sam Mendes. 1917 was nominated for Best Picture in the 92nd Academy Awards, along with nominations in nine other categories, winning three technical awards. MacKay stars in Nathalie Biancheri's film Wolf alongside Lily-Rose Depp, for which principal photography began in Ireland in August 2020. The film premiered at the Toronto International Film Festival in September 2021 as the entry for Ireland, and was theatrically release on 3 December 2021.

In 2022, MacKay starred in Christian Schwochow’s film Munich – The Edge of War for Netflix.

Upcoming projects
As of September 2021 Mackay was reportedly under consideration, along with several other men, to succeed Daniel Craig in the role of James Bond. In October 2021, he was cast in a Golden Age musical film The End along with Tilda Swinton and Stephen Graham, directed by Joshua Oppenheimer. In May 2022, it was announced that Mackay is set to star in revenge thriller Femme alongside Nathan Stewart-Jarrett.

Artistry and media reception

MacKay has been called a method actor by multiple media sources. With his acting roles, MacKay stated that he wanted "as much as [he] can to try and explore different roles and different characters, that's important to [him]". Flaunt writer Elizabeth Aubrey stated that MacKay is "someone who knows all about big parts" as illustrated in his lead roles in Sam Mendes' Academy Award-winning 1917 and Justin Kurzel's daring True History of the Kelly Gang. Aubrey added that for Mackay, "going to extremes when preparing for a role isn't something new" and that his roles are "chosen by a desire to push the boundaries of storytelling, to ask challenging questions about identity, and leave audiences with more questions than answers via stories that start important cultural conversations". The Last Magazine writer Jonathan Shia stated that,

"MacKay's CV is notable for both its length and its breadth, but he says the connecting thread is that he looks to each of his disparate projects to bring something new to his career".

MacKay himself has stated that he is inspired to put his best in every role he takes saying that, "The beauty of acting is that it is done ultimately in a very safe environment, and therefore the consequences are just the consequences of the story [...] Those things might not have actually happened to you, but they will be rooted in some kind of experience". The Independent writer Alexandra Pollard wrote that MacKay's roles are tactically "chosen to broaden his perspective on the world" and that he is "clearly intensely thoughtful, in both conversation and in his career". MacKay cites actors Eddie Marsan, Viggo Mortensen and Conor McGregor as influences for his work.

MacKay's role in 1917 is notable for launching him into mainstream media and his role received critical acclaim and numerous accolades.  His acting in the 2021 film Wolf was called "the best performance of his still-rising career". In May 2022, it was announced that Mckay was cast in Bertrand Bonello’s latest sci-fi film, The Beast.

Filmography

Film

Television

Stage

Audio

Awards and nominations

References

External links

 
 George MacKay at the British Film Institute
 
 
 

1992 births
Living people
21st-century English male actors
Audiobook narrators
English male child actors
English male film actors
English male stage actors
English male television actors
English male voice actors
English people of Australian descent
English people of Irish descent
English people of Scottish descent
English people of Ulster-Scottish descent
Male actors from London
Male feminists
People educated at The Harrodian School
People from Barnes, London
Chopard Trophy for Male Revelation winners